Masked Singer is an international music reality game show franchise. It originated from the South Korean program The King of Mask Singer, developed by Munhwa Broadcasting Corporation.

Format
The format features the celebrities who perform a song anonymously in elaborate masks or head-to-toe costumes. The panelists will then guess the identity based on clues the singers give about themselves. After their performances, the singers are voted by the audiences in each round while the panelists do not participate in the vote. The singer who receives the fewest votes in each round is unmasked and eliminated until the winner is declared.

The participating celebrities can come from various different occupational backgrounds. The original South Korean series features various musicians, actors or actresses, and comedians. The singers of the American series have spanned further up to the range of Grammy award winners, professional video gamers, YouTube influencers and professional athletes.

The voting system may also be different based on the program's country. In Armenia, Austria, the Netherlands, the United States and the UK, the votes are limited to the live studio audience members due to the show being pre-recorded. In Germany and Italy, votes are open to all viewers because the show is live. The Swedish format provides simulated live voting without the ability to actually affect the pre-recorded show, which was criticised as deceptive when it was noted after the show's second week.

The original South Korean series King of Mask Singer is a continuous, episode-by-episode format, in which the winner is decided after each tournament that lasts two weekly episodes. In the final round of each tournament, the finalist singer must face-off the previous bi-weekly winner to take over the champion title. The program thus focuses on how long the one can defend the champion title. In comparison, most of the other international versions have been following the seasonal format in which the winner is declared after a single season tournament that lasts from few months to about a year. The international programs consequently focus on who the champion is after the months to year-long tournament.

The first unofficial winner of the franchise was Solji of the South Korean girl group EXID who won in the pilot episode of the original South Korean King of Mask Singer series aired on 18 February 2015. The first official winner of the franchise was Luna of the K-Pop girl group f(x) who was declared as the winner of the first ever tournament held in the original South Korean series on 12 April 2015.

From the Chinese series, which was the first adaptation of the South Korean show to be launched outside South Korea with a seasonal format, the Chinese singer Sun Nan became the first winner outside the original South Korean series on 27 September 2015 after the two months long first season.

The Thai series was the first version of the franchise with annual seasons. The Thai singer , under the name "Durian", became the first winner to win an annual season format from the second ever franchise to be launched outside South Korea on 23 March 2017.

International versions
 Franchise with a currently airing season
 Franchise with an upcoming season
 Franchise with an unknown status
 Franchise awaiting confirmation
 Franchise that has ceased to air

Spin-off: The Masked Dancer
On  at the winter Television Critics Association press tour, Fox Alternative Entertainment and Warner Bros. Television announced that they had ordered a spin-off series, The Masked Dancer, with Ellen DeGeneres as executive producer. DeGeneres had previously conducted The Masked Dancer as a recurring segment of her syndicated talk show The Ellen DeGeneres Show, as a  parody of The Masked Singer. DeGeneres stated that the show was "gonna be just as fun and suspenseful", but "with a lot more krumping."

In 2020, a Chinese version of The Masked Dancer aired, Masked Dancing King (蒙面舞王). The winner was singer Meng Meiqi, competing as " The queen who does not wear a crown" (女王不戴冠).

In early February 2021, ITV acquired the rights to produce The Masked Dancer UK. On 4 March 2021, it was announced that ITV had commissioned the spin-off series. The series will have 12 contestants competing through seven episodes, and will be hosted by Dommett, with Ross, Gilligan, McCall, and Oti Mabuse serving as panellists. It aired in late spring 2021, filling in for Britain's Got Talent, which had its upcoming series 15 postponed until 2022 due health and safety reasons concerning the COVID-19 pandemic in the United Kingdom.

In June 2021, EndemolShine Germany announced that the show will begin airing in Germany, so far it has not been announced when and where the German version of The Masked Dancer will be shown.

Notes

References

 
Television franchises
Musical game shows
Television shows remade overseas